The second season of Canta Comigo premiered on September 25, 2019 at 11:00 p.m. (BRT / AMT) on RecordTV.

On November 21, 2019, host Gugu Liberato suffered an accident at his home in Orlando, Florida, where he fell from the roof of his house and hit his head. He was admitted to Orlando Health and it was reported that his condition was critical. Rumors of his death were initially denied, but the next day, on November 22, it was confirmed that Gugu had died.

As the season was fully completed months before Gugu's death (as three alternate endings with each finalist being crowned winner were filmed), RecordTV decided to air the final two episodes as a tribute. On December 4, 2019, Franson won the competition with 72.80% of the public vote over Débora Neves (16.09%) and group Threerapia (11.11%).

Heats
 Key
  – Artist advanced to the finals with an all-100 stand up
  – Artist advanced to the semifinals with the highest score
  – Artist advanced to the sing-off in either 2nd or 3rd place
  – Artist score enough points to place in the Top 3 but was moved out and eliminated
  – Artist didn't score enough points to place in the Top 3 and was directly eliminated
  – Artist was eliminated but received the judges' save and advanced to the wildcard

Heat 1

Sing-off details

Heat 2

Sing-off details

Heat 3

Sing-off details

Heat 4

Sing-off details

Heat 5

Sing-off details

Heat 6

Sing-off details

Heat 7

Sing-off details

Wildcard

Sing-off details

Semifinals

Week 1

Sing-off details

Week 2

Sing-off details

Finals
 Group performance: "Don't Stop Me Now"

Sing-off details

Elimination chart
Key

Ratings and reception

Brazilian ratings
All numbers are in points and provided by Kantar Ibope Media.

References

External links
 Canta Comigo 2 on R7.com

2019 Brazilian television seasons
All Together Now (franchise)